Writer and etiquette expert Charles Purdy is the author of the book Urban Etiquette: Marvelous Manners for the Modern Metropolis (Wildcat Canyon Press, 2004). He has written modern-etiquette columns for the San Francisco Weekly, Gay.com, and Genre magazine; his advice has appeared in publications such as Real Simple, The Wall Street Journal, and Men's Health; and he has appeared on numerous television shows as a guest expert. As "Charles in Charge," he has also been a regular guest of KFOG Radio's Morning Show, in San Francisco, California.

Purdy has worked as a writer and editor for Macworld magazine, Yahoo!, and Monster.com. He is now a founding partner of the creative agency Moxy Creative.

References

Etiquette writers
Living people
1969 births